is a Japanese TV series written by Shotaro Ishinomori, co-produced by Toei Company and TV Asahi and aired on TV Asahi from July 8, 1978 to January 27, 1979, with a total of 27 episodes. It is a spin-off of the 1978 film Message from Space.

Cast
 : 
 : 
 :  
  (Voice): 
 : 
 :

Suit actors
 Maboroshi: Jun Murakami
 Nagareboshi: Osamu Kaneda, Tsutomu Kitagawa

Staff

Songs
Opening theme
 
 Lyrics: 
 Composition and Arrangement: 
 Artist:  with 

Ending theme
 
 Composition and arrangement:

Episodes

Manga adaptation
A manga adaptation by Kaoru Shintani was published in Kodansha's TV Magazine from August to December 1978.

International broadcasts
Message from Space: Galactic Wars was broadcast in the Philippines in the early 1980s under the title Space Wars. It also aired in 1979 in parts of Europe under the title San Ku Kaï. It aired in parts of Latin America in the early 80s under the title "Sankuokai". In the United States, the series was retitled Space Ninja and dubbed by 3B Productions (Tranzor Z), but released straight-to-video (there is no documentation, currently, of any television broadcast) in 1981. 3B produced a compilation feature, Swords of the Space Ark, which was aired on the Christian Broadcasting Network in 1983.
In Indonesia, it aired on SCTV In Mid 90s under the name title  Ksatria dari Zelda (Knight from Zelda (Not to be confused with Legend of Zelda). Toei promoted the series overseas as Message from Space: Galaxy Wars.

 The French version's theme music for the opening and closing credits, different from the Japanese original one, was composed by Eric Charden.

DVD release
During Otakon 2018, Discotek Media announced that they licensed the show for a one-disc SD on BD release. It was released on October 29, 2019, in Japanese with English subtitles.

In popular culture
A television set playing an episode of Message from Space: Galactic Wars can be seen during a scene in the 2021 Netflix film Kate, which is set in Japan. The three main characters Hayato, Ballou and Ryu appear clearly during the scene.

References

External links
 Message from Space: Galactic Battle at Toei Tokusatsu BB Archives 

1978 Japanese television series debuts
1979 Japanese television series endings
Discotek Media
Japanese science fiction television series
Shotaro Ishinomori
Toei tokusatsu
TV Asahi original programming